"Tu Angelito" is the lead single of the re-edition album, Mi Niña Bonita: Reloaded by Venezuelan duo Chino & Nacho. This is the only single of their re-edition album and has a music video in Chino & Nacho's VEVO page.

Music video
The music video is in a High School just like in the original version of their other hit single ""Mi Niña Bonita". The song also shows similarity to Chris Brown's music video of his single, "Kiss Kiss". And in the video it has Chino and Nacho, who are trying to impress a cheerleader. Chino, being the high school hot-shot, he tries to impress the girl with his image but fails. While Nacho, being the nerd, he tries to impress the girl, by kindness and succeeds. Although the end of the music video has Chino embrace the "nerdness" that Nacho has. This also is like their own, original version, music video for "Mi Niña Bonita", where Nacho gets the girl but Chino parties with everyone else which is common in many of their music videos.

Chart performance

References

External links
Official Music Video

2010 singles
Chino & Nacho songs
Merengue songs
Record Report Top 100 number-one singles
Machete Music singles
2010 songs